The enzyme acetylalkylglycerol acetylhydrolase (EC 3.1.1.71) catalyzes the reaction

2-acetyl-1-alkyl-sn-glycerol + H2O  1-alkyl-sn-glycerol + acetate

This enzyme belongs to the family of hydrolases, specifically those acting on carboxylic ester bonds.  The systematic name of this enzyme class is 2-acetyl-1-alkyl-sn-glycerol acetylhydrolase. This enzyme is also called alkylacetylglycerol acetylhydrolase.

References

 

EC 3.1.1
Enzymes of unknown structure